Emilio Praga (18 December 1839 – 26 December 1875) was an Italian writer, painter, poet and librettist. He is the father of the artist Marco Praga. He belongs to the artistic movement Scapigliatura.

External links

 
 

1839 births
1875 deaths
Writers from Milan
Italian opera librettists
19th-century Italian painters
Italian male painters
Painters from Milan
Italian male dramatists and playwrights
19th-century Italian dramatists and playwrights
19th-century Italian male writers
19th-century Italian male artists